The Buena Vista Beavers football team represents Buena Vista University in college football at the NCAA Division III level. The Beavers are members of the American Rivers Conference (A-R-C), fielding its team in the A-R-C since the team's inception in 1976 when the conference was branded as the Iowa Intercollegiate Athletic Conference (IIAC). The Beavers play their home games at J. Leslie Rollins Stadium in Storm Lake, Iowa. 

Their head coach is Austin Dickinson, who took over the position for the 2023 season.

Conference affiliations
 Iowa Intercollegiate Athletic Conference (1976–2017; rebranded)
 American Rivers Conference (2018–present)

List of head coaches

Key

Coaches

Year-by-year results

Notes

References

External links
 

 
American football teams established in 1976
1976 establishments in Iowa